Onias may refer to:

People
( Honio, also Honiyya or Honiyahu), any of several Jewish high priests at the time of the Second Temple, described by such sources as Josephus:
Onias I, son of Jaddua and high priest in the late 4th and early 3rd century BCE
Onias II, son of Simon the Just and probably grandson of Onias I, high priest in the early 2nd century BCE
Onias III, son of Simon II and high priest in the early 2nd century BCE
Onias IV, son of Onias III who was never high priest but built the temple in the Land of Onias
Menelaus (High Priest), who according to Josephus was originally called Onias, second successor and murderer of Onias III
Onias C. Skinner (1817–1877), American jurist and legislator
Onias Mupumha (born 1978), Zimbabwean sculptor

Places
The Land of Onias, an area in Ptolemaic Egypt named after Onias IV that was heavily settled by Jews
Alpha Onias III, a planet in the Star Trek: The Next Generation episode "Future Imperfect"

Distinguish from
 Onia (disambiguation)